Podgora is a rural locality (a village) in Leninskoye Rural Settlement, Kudymkarsky District, Perm Krai, Russia. The population was 53 as of 2010.

Geography 
Podgora is located 37 km south of Kudymkar (the district's administrative centre) by road. Mazunina is the nearest rural locality.

References 

Rural localities in Kudymkarsky District